Sunfish or sun-fish may refer to:

Fish
Centrarchidae, or sunfishes, a family of freshwater fish
Lepomis, the genus of true sunfish
Molidae, the family of ocean sunfishes
Mola (fish), or sunfish
Ocean sunfish, Mola mola
Basking shark, Cetorhinus maximus, common names include sun-fish
Opah, a family of saltwater fish family Lampridae commonly known as sunfish

Arts and entertainment
The Sunfish, 2014 Danish film Klumpfisken
Sunfish (musical), 2013

Places

Sunfish, Kentucky, U.S.
Sunfish Pond, in Worthington State Forest, New Jersey, U.S.
Sunfish Township, Pike County, Ohio, U.S.

Ships
Sunfish (sailboat), a sailing dinghy
, the name of several ships of the Royal Navy
, the name of several ships of the United States Navy

See also